The Enjoy Illinois 300 is a NASCAR Cup Series race at World Wide Technology Raceway (formerly Gateway Motorsports Park) in Madison, Illinois in the Greater St. Louis metropolitan area, first held in 2022. This race replaced the Pocono Organics CBD 325, one of the two Cup Series races at Pocono Raceway.

A NASCAR Camping World Truck Series race, the Toyota 200 presented by CK Power, which was previously a standalone race on the series' schedule before the track received a Cup Series date, is held on the same weekend as this race.

History
On August 21, 2021, Adam Stern from Sports Business Journal reported that NASCAR was in talks to have the track host a Cup Series race in 2022. On September 8, he reported that Gateway would be on the 2022 Cup Series schedule and would replace one of the two races at Pocono Raceway. The schedule was released on September 15 with Gateway on Sunday, June 5.

The race length is 300 miles (240 laps). The stage lengths for the race were confirmed to be 45-95-100 laps for the Cup Series. The 2022 event was the first Cup race at the track, and also the first for the new Next Gen car at the track.

Past winners

Notes
2022: Race extended due to NASCAR overtime.

References

External links
 

NASCAR Cup Series races
NASCAR races at Gateway Motorsports Park
Annual sporting events in the United States